The Burgenland state election of 1996 was held in the Austrian state of Burgenland on 2 June 1996.

1996 elections in Austria
State elections in Austria
June 1996 events in Europe